Leutwiler is a surname. Notable people with the surname include:

Jayson Leutwiler (born 1989), Swiss-born Canadian footballer
Tom Leutwiler (1948–1993), American sailing photographer
Toni Leutwiler (1923–2009), Swiss composer and violinist

See also
Leutwyler